The William H. and Sarah D. Meneray House, at 190 S 200 W in Springville, Utah, United States, is a Late Victorian house built in c.1885.  It was listed on the National Register of Historic Places in 1998.

References

Houses completed in 1885
Houses in Utah County, Utah
Houses on the National Register of Historic Places in Utah
Victorian architecture in Utah
National Register of Historic Places in Utah County, Utah
Buildings and structures in Springville, Utah
Individually listed contributing properties to historic districts on the National Register in Utah